Quebec in English is a Canadian television miniseries which aired on CBC Television in 1965.

Premise
This series was a compilation of selected news and entertainment items that were previously broadcast on Radio-Canada, as packaged for an English-speaking audience.

The debut episode included profiles of an artists' event in Montreal, and a feature on the Pilgrims of Saint Michael ("Les Berets Blancs"), a Roman Catholic group which espouses Social Credit philosophy. Other segments presented include excerpts from the youth television program Jeunesse Oblige and stories on a Quebec City riot control vehicle and on a woman who constructed a personal bomb shelter.

Scheduling
This half-hour series was broadcast Sundays at 2:00 p.m. (Eastern time) from 13 to 27 June 1965.

References

External links
 

CBC Television original programming
1965 Canadian television series debuts
1965 Canadian television series endings